Cattle mutilation (also known as bovine excision and unexplained livestock death, or animal mutilation) is the killing and mutilation of cattle under unusual, usually bloodless circumstances. This phenomenon has been observed among wild animals as well. Worldwide, sheep, horses, goats, pigs, rabbits, cats, dogs, bison, deer and elk have been reported mutilated with similar bloodless excisions; often an ear, eyeball, jaw flesh, tongue, lymph nodes, genitals and rectum are removed.

Since the first reports of animal mutilations, various explanations have been offered, ranging from natural decomposition and normal predation to cults and secretive governmental and military agencies, to a range of speculations, including cryptid predators (like the chupacabra) and extraterrestrials. Mutilations have been the subject of two independent federal investigations in the United States.

History
The earliest known documented outbreak of unexplained livestock deaths occurred in early 1606 "...about the city of London and some of the shires adjoining. Whole slaughters of sheep have been made, in some places to number 100, in others less, where nothing is taken from the sheep but their tallow and some inward parts, the whole carcasses, and fleece remaining still behind. "Of this sundry conjectures, but most agree that it tendeth towards some fireworks." The outbreak was noted in the official records of the Court of James I of England. Charles Fort collected many accounts of cattle mutilations that occurred in England in the late 19th and early 20th centuries.
John Keel mentioned investigating animal mutilation cases in 1966 (while with Ivan T. Sanderson) that were being reported in the Upper Ohio River Valley, around Gallipolis, Ohio.

The "Snippy" horse mutilation
Animal mutilation was relatively unknown until 1967, when the Pueblo Chieftain published a story about a horse called "Snippy"  that was mysteriously killed and mutilated in Alamosa, Colorado.

On September 9, 1967, Agnes King and her son Harry reportedly found the dead body of their three-year-old horse. The horse's head and neck had been skinned and defleshed, and the body displayed cuts that, to King, looked very precise. No blood was at the scene, according to Harry, and a strong medicinal odor was in the air.

The story was republished by the wider press and distributed nationwide; this case was the first to feature speculation that extraterrestrial beings and unidentified flying objects were associated with mutilation.  A subsequent investigation by Wadsworth Ayer for the Condon Committee  concluded that "There was no evidence to support the assertion that the horse's death was associated in any way to abnormal causes".

When the Lewises phoned Alamosa County Sheriff Ben Phillips, he told them that the death was probably due to "a lightning strike" and never bothered to visit the site. Early press coverage of the case misnamed Lady as Snippy. Snippy was Lady's sire and belonged to Nellie's husband, Berle Lewis. Later press coverage mentions that the horse had been shot "in the rump". However, two students from Alamosa State College confessed to sneaking out into the pasture and shooting the horse several weeks after the case was publicized.

1973 mutilations
On December 4, 1973,   law enforcement reported a wave of cattle mutilations in seven counties across Kansas and Nebraska.  Sexual organs were reported having been removed.   Weeks later, it was reported 38 mysterious cattle deaths had occurred across 11 counties.  Multiple lab tests suggested many of the animals had died from "blackleg", a cattle disease.

1974 mutilations and unidentified helicopters
By June 1974, mutilations were reported to have spread to Lancaster County, Nebraska. On August 20, 1974, the Lincoln Journal Star reported strange, unidentified helicopters shining spotlights into fields that would soon become mutilation sites.  One investigator claimed helicopter sightings had become a nightly occurrence, with both the FAA and the National Guard reportedly being unaware of any helicopter activity.

After ranchers began forming night vigils, the National Guard warned its helicopter pilots to fly at higher than normal altitude to avoid fire from "jittery farmers".  State leaders called for an investigation.

By October 1974, it was reported that UFO conspiracy theorists considered cattle mutilations might be related to flying saucers.

Later developments
Senator Floyd K. Haskell contacted the FBI asking for help in 1975 due to public concern regarding the issue. He claimed there had been 130 mutilations in Colorado alone, and further reports across nine states. A 1979 FBI report indicated that, according to investigations by the New Mexico State Police, there had been an estimated 8,000 mutilations in Colorado, causing approximately $1,000,000 damage.

Many cases of mutilation have been reported worldwide since the 1967 Snippy incident, chiefly in the Americas and Australia. In South America, an estimated 3,500 incidents have occurred since 2002, when around 400 cases were reported. Mutilation investigators assert that a large number of cases are never reported to authorities, perhaps no more than one in ten.

In the summer of 2019, five bulls were mutilated at the Silvies Valley Ranch in Oregon. It is estimated that each 2,000 pound bull was worth US$6,000. The FBI has made no comment on whether or not there is an investigation on this particular event but the Silvies Valley Ranch offered a $25,000 reward for information on the topic.

Characteristics

Physical characteristics

In most cases, mutilation wounds appear to be clean and carried out surgically. Mutilated animals are sometimes reported to have been drained of blood and show no sign of blood in the immediate area or around their wounds.

According to Howard Burgess, nearly 90 percent of mutilated cattle are between four and five years old.

In some cases, strange marks or imprints near the site have been found. In the famous "Snippy" case, there was an absolute absence of tracks in a  radius of the carcass (even the horse's own tracks disappeared within  of the body.) But within this radius, several small holes were found seemingly "punched" in the ground and two bushes were absolutely flattened. In Rio Arriba County, New Mexico, June 1976, a "trail of suction cup-like impressions" was found leading from a mutilated three-year-old cow. Similar incidents were reported in the area in 1978.

Laboratory reports
Laboratory reports carried out on some mutilated animals have shown unusually high or low levels of vitamins or minerals in tissue samples, and the presence of chemicals not normally found in animals. However, not all mutilated animals display these anomalies, and those that do have slightly different anomalies from one another. On account of the time between death and necropsy, and a lack of background information on specific cattle, investigators have often found it impossible to determine if these variations are connected to the animals' deaths or not.

In one case documented by New Mexico police and the FBI, an 11-month-old cross Hereford-Charolais bull, belonging to a Mr. Manuel Gomez of Dulce, New Mexico, was found mutilated on March 24, 1978. It displayed "classic" mutilation signs, including the removal of the rectum and sex organs with what appeared to be “a sharp and precise instrument” and its internal organs were found to be inconsistent with a normal case of death followed by predation.

"Both the liver and the heart were white and mushy. Both organs had the texture and consistency of peanut butter"
Gabriel L Valdez, New Mexico Police

The animal's heart as well as bone and muscle samples were sent to the Los Alamos Scientific Laboratory for microscopic and bacteriological studies, while samples from the animal's liver were sent to two separate private laboratories.

Los Alamos detected the presence of naturally occurring Clostridium bacteria in the heart, but was unable to reach any conclusions because of the possibility that the bacteria represented postmortem contamination. No microscopic changes of pathological significance were found in the heart tissue.

Samples from the animal's liver were found to be completely devoid of copper and to contain 4 times the normal level of zinc, potassium and phosphorus. The scientists performing the analysis were unable to explain these anomalies.

Blood samples taken at the scene were reported to be "light pink in color" and “Did not clot after several days” while the animal's hide was found to be unusually brittle for a fresh death (the animal was estimated to have been dead for 5 hours) and the flesh underneath was found to be discolored.

None of the laboratories were able to report any firm conclusions on the cause of the blood or tissue damage. At the time, it was suggested that a burst of radiation may have been used to kill the animal, blowing apart its red blood cells in the process. This hypothesis was later discarded as subsequent reports from the Los Alamos Scientific Laboratory later confirmed the presence of anti-coagulants in samples taken from other cows mutilated in the region.

Conventional explanations
As with most disputed phenomena, there are a number of potential explanations for the causes of cattle mutilations, ranging from death by natural causes to purposeful acts by unknown individuals.

U.S. governmental explanation
After coming under increasing public pressure, Federal authorities launched a comprehensive investigation of the mutilation phenomenon.

In May 1979, the case was passed on to the FBI, which granted jurisdiction under Title 18. The investigation was dubbed "Operation Animal Mutilation".

The investigation was funded by a $44,170 grant from the Law Enforcement Assistance Administration, and was headed by FBI agent Kenneth Rommel. It had five key objectives:
 To determine the reliability of the information on which the grant was based, which entailed gathering as much information as possible about the cases reported in New Mexico prior to May 1979
 To determine the cause of as many mutilations as possible, especially those reported in New Mexico
 To determine if livestock mutilations as described constitute a major law enforcement problem
 If these mutilations do constitute a major law enforcement problem, to determine the scope of the problem and to offer recommendations on how to deal with it
 If it is shown that the mutilation phenomenon is not a law enforcement problem, to recommend that no further law enforcement investigations be funded.

Rommel's final report, released in June 1980, was 297 pages long; in the report's introduction, Rommel stated: "According to some estimates, by 1979 10,000 head of cattle have been mysteriously mutilated". However, the report concluded that the mutilations were predominantly the result of natural predation, but that some cases contained anomalies that could not be accounted for by conventional wisdom. The FBI was unable to identify any individuals responsible for the mutilations. Details of the investigation are now available under the Freedom of Information Act. The released material includes correspondence from Rommel where he states that "most credible sources have attributed this damage to normal predator and scavenger activity".

New Mexico State patrolman Gabe Valdez, who by the time of the Rommel report had investigated dozens of mutilation cases, told investigator Christopher O'Brien that "during the six to eight months when Rommel was actively investigating the mutilations in New Mexico, the state (especially the northern tier) became suddenly quiet with very few (if any) true mutilations being reported to officials". Valdez was convinced that Rommel never was able to investigate a single high-strange case, because the mutilators moved their operations to other parts of the west. Rommel (a former FBI bank robbery expert) was disgusted by dead necrotic cows and chose to let others do the actual investigations while he waited upwind in the car.

Western Canada, during this period, was especially hard hit. During the six to eight months of Rommel's investigation, RCMP investigator Corporal Lyn Lauber of the Calgary detachment (who was in charge of the Canadian mutilation probe) investigated numerous high-strange cases. When Rommel's final report was released to the public. Lauber answered an inquiry by investigator Tommy Bland: "I find it difficult to understand how Rommel could make a statement such as this, without ever having personally witnessed a [real] mutilation firsthand". He also stated that "I would like to see Rommel write off our confirmed cases as due to predators".

Prior to the involvement of the FBI, the ATF launched their own investigation into the phenomenon.

Both federal investigations were preceded (and followed, to some extent) by a state-level investigation carried out by law enforcement officials in New Mexico. This investigation reported finding evidence that some mutilated animals had been tranquilized and treated with an anti-coagulant prior to their mutilation. It also contended that alleged surgical techniques performed during mutilations had become "more professional" over time. However, officers in charge were unable to determine responsibility or motive.

The ATF investigation was headed by ATF Agent Donald Flickinger. The New Mexico investigation was headed by Officer Gabe Valdez of the New Mexico State Patrol, with the assistance of Cattle Inspector Jim Dyad and Officer Howard Johnston of the New Mexico Department of Game and Fish.

Natural causes

While many unconventional explanations have been put forward to explain cattle mutilations, a variety of scientists, veterinary workers, and knowledgeable observers (including farmers and other agricultural workers) have suggested more conventional ideas, most of which revolve around the hypothesis that "mutilated" animals died of natural causes and were subjected to known terrestrial phenomena – including the action of predators, parasites, and scavengers.

Missing or mutilated mouth, lips, anus, and genitalia are explained as:
 Contraction of missing/damaged areas due to dehydration.
 The actions of small scavengers and burrowing parasites seeking to enter or consume the body in areas where skin is at its thinnest.

Missing/mutilated eyes and soft internal organs are explained as:
 The action of carrion feeding insects such as blowflies, and opportunistic or carrion birds such as vultures, which are known to direct themselves toward an animal's eyes, and to enter the body through the openings of the mouth and anus in order to feed on soft internal organs.

Absence of blood is explained as:
 Blood pooling in the lowest points in the body where it will break down into its basic organic components.
 Blood that is external to the body, or in the area of a wound being consumed by insects or reduced by solar desiccation.

Surgical incisions in the skin are explained as:
 Tears in the skin created when it is stretched by postmortem bloat and/or as dehydration causes the animal's hide to shrink and split, often in linear cuts.
 Incisions caused by scavengers or predators, possibly exacerbated by the above.

The hypothesis that natural phenomena account for most mutilation characteristics has been validated by a number of experiments, including one cited by long-time scientific skeptic Robert T. Carroll, conducted by Washington County (Arkansas) Sheriff's Department. In the experiment, the body of a recently deceased cow was left in a field and observed for 48 hours. During the 48 hours, postmortem bloating was reported to have caused incision-like tears in the cow's skin that matched the "surgical" cuts reported on mutilated cows, while the action of blowflies and maggots reportedly matched the soft tissue damage observed on mutilated cows.

Experiments have also been conducted to compare the different reactions of surgically cut hide/flesh and predated hide/flesh to natural exposure. They demonstrated pronounced differences between surgical cuts and non surgical cuts over time.

Some ranchers have disputed the scientific "natural causes hypothesis" on the grounds that the mutilated animals often fall outside of the normal categories of natural deaths by predation or disease. One reason cited is that the animals were healthy and showed no sign of disease prior to death, and were large and strong enough not to be a likely target for a predator. In some cases, ranchers have reported that the mutilated cattle were among the healthiest and strongest animals in their herd.

Human intervention

Animal cruelty and human activity
It is alternatively hypothesised that cattle mutilations are the result of two unrelated deviant phenomena. The bulk of mutilations are the result of predation and other natural processes, and those with anomalies that cannot be explained in this way are the work of humans who derive pleasure or sexual stimulation from mutilating animals.

Human attacks against animals are a recognized phenomenon. There have been many recorded cases around the world, and many convictions. Typically the victims of such attacks are cats, dogs, and other family pets, and the actions of humans are usually limited to acts of cruelty such as striking, burning, or beating animals. However, attacks have also been recorded against larger animals, including sheep, cows, and horses.
Humans, particularly those with sociopathic disorders, have been found to have mutilated animals in elaborate ways using knives or surgical instruments.

On April 20, 1979, C Hibbs of the New Mexico State Veterinary diagnostics Laboratory spoke before a hearing chaired by Senator Harrison Schmitt. Hibbs testified that mutilation fell into three categories, one of which was animals mutilated by humans.  FBI records did not record the percentage of mutilated animals that fell into this category.

Cults
Closely related to the deviant hypothesis is the hypothesis that cattle mutilations are the result of cult activity. However, contrary to the deviancy hypothesis, which holds that cattle are mutilated at random by individual deviants, the cult hypothesis holds that cattle mutilations are coordinated acts of ritual sacrifice carried out by organized groups.

Beliefs held by proponents of the cult hypothesis vary, but may include:
 That the apparent absence of blood at mutilation sites may indicate cult members would harvest it
 That organs have been removed from cattle for use in rituals
 That unborn calves have been harvested from mutilated cattle.

The hypothesis that cults were responsible for cattle mutilation was developed in the U.S. during the 1970s and 1980s, a time of growing national concern over cults (such as the Peoples Temple and Jonestown) and ritual satanic abuse ("Satanic panic").

In 1975, the US Treasury Department assigned Donald Flickinger to investigate the existence of connections between cults and the mutilation of cattle. The operation came under the jurisdiction of the Bureau of Alcohol, Tobacco and Firearms.

Flickinger recorded a number of 'unusual' incidents and circumstantial evidence, but was unable to find sufficient evidence of cult involvement for the ATF to take further action. Media reports of the time reported his investigation was dropped when it was determined cattle deaths were not a prelude to a co-ordinated campaign against elected officials by cult members.

However, there were various reports during the time of menacing groups prowling around mutilation sites. In September 1975, a forestry service employee in Blaine County, Idaho, reported seeing a group of people in black hooded robes. Several cattle were found mutilated in the area the following day. On October 9, 1975, a motorist on U.S. Highway 95 in northern Idaho, in an area of frequent cattle mutilation, reported to police that some 15 masked individuals formed a roadblock with linked arms, forcing him to turn around.

Since the beginning of the cult hypothesis, law enforcement agents in several states and provinces, including Alberta, Idaho, Montana, and Iowa have reported evidence implicating cults in several instances of cattle mutilations.

During their investigations, the FBI and the ATF were unable to find appropriate evidence, including signs of consistency between mutilations, to substantiate that the animals had been the victims of any form of ritual sacrifice or organized mutilation effort. They were also unable to determine how or why a cult would perform procedures that would result in the anomalies reported in some necropsies, or to verify that the anomalies were 1) connected to the mutilations themselves 2) the result of human intervention.

In most cases, mutilations were either ruled due to natural causes, or the cattle were too far decayed for any useful conclusions to be drawn. Some cases of cult hysteria were traced back to fabrication by individuals unrelated to the incident. In one case it was concluded that claims had been falsified by a convict seeking favorable terms on his sentence in exchange for information. In another case, claims were traced back to local high school students who had circulated rumors as a joke.

Government or military experimentation
In his 1997 article “Dead Cows I've Known”, cattle mutilation researcher Charles T. Oliphant speculates cattle mutilation to be the result of covert research into emerging cattle diseases, and the possibility they could be transmitted to humans.

Additionally, a 2002 National Institute for Discovery Science report relates the eyewitness testimony of two Cache County, Utah, police officers. The area had seen many unusual cattle deaths, and ranchers had organized armed patrols to surveil the unmarked aircraft which they claimed were associated with the livestock deaths. The police witnesses claim to have encountered several men in an unmarked U.S. Army helicopter in 1976 at a small community airport in Cache County. The witnesses asserted that after this heated encounter, cattle mutilations in the region ceased for about five years.

Biochemist Colm Kelleher, who has investigated several purported mutilations first-hand, argues that the mutilations are most likely a clandestine U.S. government effort to track the spread of Bovine spongiform encephalopathy ("mad cow disease") and related diseases, such as scrapie.

A brief sampling of cases: On April 8, 1979, three police officers in Dulce, New Mexico, reported a mysterious aircraft which resembled a U.S. military helicopter hovering around a site following a wave of alleged mutilation which claimed 16 cows. On July 15, 1974, two unregistered helicopters, a white helicopter and a black twin-engine aircraft were reported to have opened fire on Robert Smith Jr. while he was driving his tractor on his farm in Honey Creek, Iowa. This attack followed a rash of alleged mutilations in the area and across the nearby border in Nebraska. The reports of "helicopter" involvement have been used to explain why some cattle appear to have been "dropped" from considerable heights.

Other explanations

Aliens and UFOs
In 1974, a few months after the first spate of alleged mutilations in the US, multiple farmers in Nebraska claimed to witness UFOs on the nights their cattle were harmed. The sightings were hailed by UFO researchers as the first physical evidence of extraterrestrial life.

Government interference
At the same time that UFO reports were being filed with law enforcement, larger number of ranchers claimed to see black helicopters around their fields, coinciding with the cattle mutilations. Although some initially thought these were used by cattle rustlers, suspicion soon pointed toward a military operation running out of Fort Riley, Kansas.

By 1975, the problem was so prevalent, that some ranchers formed armed vigilante groups to patrol their fields at night. Authorities ran ads in Colorado urging ranchers to not shoot at their survey helicopters.

In July 1975, reporter Dane Edwards of the Brush Banner published a cattle mutilation story and began investigating a theory that a cult was responsible. When the origin of the cult theory was traced to a federal inmate and no cult members were ever identified, ranchers and law enforcement started looking for other explanations.

Edwards reported his theory that the government was testing cattle parts to develop biological weapons to use in Vietnam, going so far as to write to Colorado Senator Floyd K. Haskell during Haskell's investigation to accuse agents of threatening him into silence.

In October, Edwards gave an interview to the Gazette (Colorado Springs Gazette Telegraph), announcing a theory that a government project was behind the mutilations. He expressed frustration that the FBI would not get involved and said he would be writing a book explaining "how the project was conceived". Shortly after, he was fired by the Gazette and then disappeared. On December 5, 1975, Edwards' wife reported him as a missing person.

Edwards reemerged in the 1990s. He had adopted a new name, Dr. David Ellsworth, and founded an English-language instruction program that was adopted by many federal universities in Mexico.

Unknown creatures explanation
Local folklore has attributed the mutilations to chupacabras or similar creatures.

See also
 Horse ripping
 Black helicopters
 Linda Moulton Howe
 List of mutilatory procedures on animals
 List of topics characterized as pseudoscience
 Surplus killing
 Croydon Cat Killer

Footnotes

External links
The Skeptic's Dictionary explanation of Cattle Mutilation
Human Mutilation by Aliens – Brazilian Case With Photos
FBI files on Animal Mutilation 
Animal Mutilation News at Paranormalnews.com
Return of the Mootilators. Mark Pilkington reports on Argentinian cases
 The Straight Dope, on Cattle Mutilations

UFO-related phenomena
Conspiracy theory
Alien abduction
Cruelty to animals
Animal killing